Christopher Lee Pettiet (February 12, 1976 – April 12, 2000) was an American television and film actor best known for his role as Jesse James in the Western TV series The Young Riders and as Zach Crandell in the cult comedy film Don't Tell Mom the Babysitter's Dead (1991).

Career
Pettiet began his career as a child actor making appearances in television series such as Star Trek: The Next Generation, L.A. Law, Empty Nest, and Doogie Howser, M.D. He played the middle brother in the 1991 comedy film Don't Tell Mom the Babysitter's Dead. Also in 1991, Pettiet appeared in the hit film Point Break alongside actors Patrick Swayze and Keanu Reeves, and in the same year joined the final season of The Young Riders as a teenage version of Jesse James.

Most of his subsequent career was in episodic television and independent films, including Boys and Carried Away, both released in 1996. He had a brief recurring role on the first season of MTV's Undressed. Pettiet's last appearance was in a 1999 episode of Judging Amy.

Death
Pettiet died of an accidental drug overdose on April 12, 2000 in Los Angeles at the age of 24. His autopsy report listed that the probable combined effect of cocaine, propoxyphene, and diazepam had caused his death. His autopsy also attributed his death to "probable cardiomyopathy" but it was only a contributing condition and not an immediate cause. He was cremated and his ashes were scattered at sea off of Topanga Canyon Road in Santa Monica, California. After his death, his acting coach, Kevin McDermott, founded a scholarship fund in his name to help young actors to attend Center Stage LA where he had trained.

Filmography

Accolades

References

External links

 

Male actors from Texas
American male child actors
American male film actors
American male television actors
Drug-related deaths in California
People from Dallas
1976 births
2000 deaths
20th-century American male actors